Jiangzhe province or Chiangche was a province of the Yuan dynasty established in 1276. It included the southern portion of Jiangsu south of the Yangtze River, Zhejiang, Fujian, modern-day Penghu of Taiwan Province and part of northern Guangdong. With capital was initially at Yangzhou, but in 1297 it was moved to Hangzhou Lu.

The former Song dynasty circuits which were incorporated into Jiangzhe included Liangzhe East Circuit, Liangzhe West Circuit, Fujian Circuit, and Guangnan East Circuit.

After the establishment of the Ming dynasty, Jiangzhe province was split into Zhejiang and Fujian, with part of the province also being combined into Guangdong.

See also
 Yang Province
 Wuyue
 Liangzhe Circuit
 Viceroy of Liangjiang
 Jiangnan Province

References

Provinces of the Yuan dynasty
1276 establishments
History of Zhejiang
History of Fujian
History of Guangdong